The 1945 Palestine Premier League was the first edition of the first tier in the Arab Palestinian football league system (organised by the APSF). The league champions and winners of the trophy, named Arab Bank Shield, was Islamic Sport Club Jaffa.

Competition format
Clubs affiliated to the APSF split into six regional leagues. The champion of each of the six regions advanced to the Palestine championship.

Results

Semi-finals

Source:

Final

References

Palestine Premier League
2